Jim Gallagher (born 16 March 1931) is a former Australian rules footballer who played with Footscray in the Victorian Football League (VFL) during the 1950s. He was a member of Footscray's 1954 premiership winning side, playing as a half back flanker. Despite appearing 151 times for the Bulldogs in the VFL he never once kicked a goal.

Gallagher was a VFL interstate representative and was named in the interchange bench in Footscray's official 'Team of the Century'.

References

External links

1931 births
Australian rules footballers from Victoria (Australia)
Western Bulldogs players
Western Bulldogs Premiership players
Living people
One-time VFL/AFL Premiership players